Reg Parnell Racing was a privateer Formula One team during the 1950s and 1960s. The team was founded by ex-Formula One driver Reg Parnell after he retired from racing. It raced as Yeoman Credit Racing in 1961 and as the Bowmaker Racing Team in 1962. John Surtees also took pole for the team at the 1962 Dutch Grand Prix.

Formula One World Championship results
(key) (Results in bold indicate pole position; results in italics indicate fastest lap; † indicates shared drive.) 

‡ At the 1964 Austrian Grand Prix Amon used a car borrowed from Team Lotus with Climax V8 engine.

References

Formula One entrants
British auto racing teams
Lotus Cars